François-Xavier Guerra (27 November 1942 – 10 November 2002) was a French historian born in Spain, who wrote of the Spanish Golden Age and of the history of Mexico up to and during the Mexican Revolution.

1942 births
2002 deaths
French male non-fiction writers
20th-century French historians
20th-century French male writers